The Boston mayoral election of 1979 occurred on Tuesday, November 6, 1979, between Mayor Kevin White and state senator Joseph F. Timilty. This was the second election in a row between White and Timilty. White once again defeated Timilty and was elected to a fourth term.

The nonpartisan municipal preliminary election was held on September 25, 1979.

Candidates
Joseph F. Timilty, member of the Massachusetts Senate since 1972. Member of the Boston City Council from 1967 to 1971.
Kevin White, Mayor of Boston since 1968, Massachusetts Secretary of the Commonwealth from 1961 to 1967.

Candidates eliminated in preliminary
Luis F. Castro, member of the Socialist Workers Party.
David Finnegan, member of the Boston School Committee since 1975.
Mel King, Member of the Massachusetts House of Representatives since 1973.
Laurence R. Sherman, member of the U.S. Labor Party.

Results

See also
List of mayors of Boston, Massachusetts

References

1979 in Boston
Boston mayoral
Boston
Mayoral elections in Boston
Non-partisan elections